Ekaterina Igorevna Petaikina (born 23 February 1995) is a Russian pair skater. With former partner Maxim Kurdyukov, she placed 6th at the 2012 Junior Worlds and is the 2012 Russian Junior silver medalist.

Career 
Petaikina/Kurdyukov began competing on the ISU Junior Grand Prix series in 2009. In the 2011–12 JGP season, they finished fourth in Latvia and won bronze in Austria. Their results qualified them for the 2011–12 Junior Grand Prix Final, where they placed fourth. Petaikina/Kurdyukov took the silver medal at the 2012 Russian Junior Championships and were sent to the 2012 World Junior Championships where they finished sixth. In May 2012, the pair ended their partnership. 

Petaikina teamed up with Konstantin Bezmaternikh and skated with him for one season.

Programs 
(with Kurdyukov)

Competitive highlights

With Bezmaternikh

With Kurdyukov

References

External links 

 

Russian female pair skaters
Figure skaters from Moscow
1995 births
Living people